Pyralausta is a genus of moths of the family Crambidae. It contains only one species, Pyralausta bivialis, which is found on Borneo.

References

Natural History Museum Lepidoptera genus database

Pyraustinae
Crambidae genera
Monotypic moth genera
Taxa named by George Hampson